Renjishi (連獅子), or Two Lions, is a kabuki  dance with lyrics written by Kawatake Mokuami, choreography by Hanayagi Jusuke I and music by Kineya Shōjirō III and Kineya Katsusaburō II, first performed in 1872.

Originally staged for a private dance recital in 1861, it was later expanded and reused in July 1872 as the fourth act for another play at the Murayama-za in Tokyo. Renjishi continued to evolve, with two different sets of music being used (both still performed), and the comic interlude added in 1901. A later version was created for one father and two lion cubs.

One of many kabuki works based on the noh play Shakkyō (The Stone Bridge), in the last stages of Renjishi development as a kabuki dance it was brought closer back to the noh version. In particular, in the February 1901 performance at the Tokyo-za, Renjishi was turned into a matsubame mono (pine-board play), modifying the stage to replicate the noh stage's green pine tree background.

It is a popular dance in the kabuki repertoire that is often performed.

Characters 
 Ukon - an actor
 Sakon - another actor, younger
 Rennen - a Nichiren buddhist monk on pilgrimage to Mount Seiryō
 Hennen - a Pure Land buddhist monk on pilgrimage to Mount Seiryō
 Spirit of the Parent Lion
 Spirit of the Lion Cub
 Stage assistants
 Nagauta - musical ensemble

Plot

Performances 

The first performance of Renjishi happened at a private dance recital in May 1861 at the Nakamura-rō, a restaurant in the Ryōgoku are in Edo. The recital celebrated the name succession of the famous dance master Hanayagi Jusuke I (1821–1903) by his son Hanayagi Yoshijirō. Father and son performed the original dance, with Jusuke's choreography and Kawatake Mokuami's lyrics. The performance took place in a very simple setting, with only a golden screen, and no costumes or makeup. This unadorned style of dance is called suodori.

The dance made its debut at the kabuki stage in July 1872 at the Murayama-za in Tokyo, as the fourth act for another play. Bandō Hikosaburō V played the role of the parent lion, and Sawamura Tosshō II the role of the cub lion.

Renjishi was staged at the Kabuki-za in Tokyo in July 2017, with Ichikawa Ebizō XI as the parent lion and Bandō Minosuke II as the cub.

In September 2019, the Kabuki actor Ichikawa Udanji III and his son Ukon performed part of the Renjishi at the 2019 Rugby World Cup opening ceremony as the shishi of Renjishi were used as mascots for the tournament.

Translation 

The play was translated into English by Paul M. Griffith in Kabuki Plays on Stage IV: Restoration and Reform, 1872-1905, edited by James R. Brandon and Samuel L. Leiter and published in 2003.

 Kabuki Plays on Stage IV: Restoration and Reform, 1872-1905. (2003) University of Hawaii Press,  .

See also 
 Shaguma

External links 

Renjishi at Kabuki21.com

References 
 

1872 plays
Kabuki plays
Buddhist plays